The 1968–69 Kansas Jayhawks men's basketball team represented the University of Kansas during the 1968–69 college men's basketball season. On February 3, 1969 the Jayhawks reached the milestone victory by recording their thousandth win for the program by defeating the Oklahoma State Cowboys in Lawrence.

Roster
Dave Robisch
Jo Jo White
Bruce Sloan
Rich Bradshaw
Pierre Russell
Roger Brown
Phil Harmon
Greg Douglas
Dave Nash
Tim Natsus
Howard Arndt
Chester Lawrence

Schedule

References

Kansas Jayhawks men's basketball seasons
Kansas
Kansas
Kansas
Kansas